Chaplains Tableland is a high tableland just north of Mount Lister in the Royal Society Range. It was named by the Advisory Committee on Antarctic Names in 1963 in honor of the chaplains who have served in Antarctica, primarily at McMurdo Station. The feature is clearly visible from McMurdo Station.

References
 

Plateaus of Antarctica
Landforms of Victoria Land
Scott Coast